— (Right part of sign) 

 — (Left part of sign)

  Mur (cuneiform), and Har (cuneiform), most common uses in Epic of Gilgamesh; also Hur (cuneiform)

The cuneiform sign mur, (also the har, hur, hír sign),  is a common-use sign of the Amarna letters, the Epic of Gilgamesh, and other cuneiform texts (for example Hittite texts).

Linguistically, it has the alphabetical usage, for consonants in texts for h, r, or m, and also a replacement for the four vowels of a, e,  i, or u. The sign can also be used syllabically for the h-r variants, or for mur (used especially for Akkadian amāru, for "to see"), and an example letter of the Amarna letters being Amarna letter EA 289.

Epic of Gilgamesh usage
The mur sign usage in the Epic of Gilgamesh is as follows: (har, 40 times, hír, 1 time, hur, 18 times, and mur, 27 times. And for the logogram HUR, 2 times.

Jerusalem scribe usage, EA 287, EA 288, EA 289

The Jerusalem scribe used mur (cuneiform) in EA 287-289. The usage is an exclamatory, at sentence starts (an interjection). The spelling in the Akkadian language, for the scribe is a (cuneiform)-(mur (cuneiform)), as the Akkadian word being referenced as an "Exclamation", and is "Amāru–!", (for "to see"), and in the English language is approximately — "Look (here)–!". In some cases,  like EA 288, the Jerusalem scribe uses it two lines apart, lines 41 and 43, of the letter Reverse.

The lines: (EA 288, Reverse)
41. a-mur 1=dištu-ur-ba-zu gaz(GAZ#) d[e4-k]a-(dâku)
___amāru–! — 1=dišTurbazu gaz(GAZ#) d[e4-k]a-(dâku)
___Look (here)–! — Turbazu "killed"-!
42. i-na abul(KÁ.GAL) alu(IRI#) sí-lu-úki qa-al šarru(LUGAL)ru
___ina abullu ālu Siluki ga-al šarru(LUGAL)ru
___in city-gate city Siluki, "tragedy"?, Kingru (Phar.)
43. a-mur 1=m(male)=dišzi-im-ri-da alu(IRI) la#-ki#-siki
___amāru–! — 1=m(male)=dišZimredda ālu(IRI) Lachishki
___Look (here)–! — mZimredda city Lachish

References

 Parpola, 1971. The Standard Babylonian Epic of Gilgamesh, Parpola, Simo, Neo-Assyrian Text Corpus Project, c 1997, Tablet I thru Tablet XII, Index of Names, Sign List,

Cuneiform signs